Estancia Grande Estancia Grande is a municipality in the Yuquerí district of the Concordia department in the Entre Ríos Province, Argentina. The municipality comprises the towns of Calabacilla and Estancia Grande and rural areas. The main productive activities are citriculture, livestock, forestry, horticulture and beekeeping.In the 2010 census, the municipality had 2,512 inhabitants.

References

Populated places in Entre Ríos Province